The 12329 / 12330 West Bengal Sampark Kranti Express is the Sampark Kranti Express category train which connects Sealdah in Kolkata and  in Delhi. This train was first announced during the budget session on 2004–05 of Indian Railways by then the Minister of Railways, Nitish Kumar. Thus this train was inaugurated on 11 March 2005 from Sealdah and on 12 March 2005 from Delhi

Schedule 

West Bengal Sampark Kranti runs once a week. It departs from Sealdah at 13:10 hrs on Tuesday and arrives on its subsequent day at Anand Vihar Terminal at 11:15 hrs. On its return journey, it departs from Anand Vihar Terminal at 19:10 and arrives at Sealdah at 17:30 hrs.

In its journey, it passes through Indian states of West Bengal, Jharkhand, Bihar, Uttar Pradesh and Delhi.

Route & halts

Rake and composition
The West Bengal Sampark Kranti uses the modern state of the art LHB coach. It carries one AC First cum AC Two tier, one AC Two Tier, three AC Three Tier, eleven Sleeper class, three General/Unreserved class, two Generator cum Luggage Vans and one pantry car.

The coach composition of West Bengal Sampark Kranti from Sealdah to Anand Vihar Terminal is:

While on its return journey the rake reverses.

Traction 
It is hauled by a Howrah-based WAP-7/ Kanpur-based WAP-7 locomotive throughout its entire journey.

Other details 
It shares its rake with the Sealdah–Amritsar Jallianwalla Bagh Express.

References

Sources
 http://indiarailinfo.com/train/1692 India Rail Info
 http://indiarailinfo.com/train/1693 India Rail Info
 http://indiarailinfo.com/train/7845 India Rail Info
 http://indiarailinfo.com/train/7865 India Rail Info

Delhi–Kolkata trains
Sampark Kranti Express trains
Rail transport in Jharkhand
Rail transport in Uttar Pradesh
Railway services introduced in 2005